New Chicago may refer to:
New Chicago, California
New Chicago, Indiana
New Chicago, Montana
New Chicago, Memphis, part of North Memphis, Memphis, Tennessee
New Chicago, Jefferson Township, Montgomery County, Ohio
A former nickname for Deming, New Mexico

See also
Nueva Chicago (disambiguation)